Thomas Kurz (born 3 April 1988) is a German professional footballer who plays as a midfielder.

Career
Born in Altötting, Kurz began his career with SV 1963 Unterneukirchen, before joining Bayern Munich in 2003. After two years in Bayern's junior team, he moved on to SV Wacker Burghausen, where he came through the youth team, making his debut in 2007 as a substitute for Thomas Neubert in a 1–0 win over Karlsruher SC II. He played 23 games in the Regionalliga Süd, scoring three goals as the team qualified for the new 3. Liga. In two years at that level he played 36 games, scoring seven goals, before returning to FC Bayern in July 2010, to play for their reserve team. Initially he played in his usual position as a striker, but with the increased competition with the arrival of Marcos Alvarez and Steffen Wohlfarth in January 2011, he was often deployed as a central defender. He was released by Bayern at the end of the 2010–11 season after their relegation from the third tier and joined SSV Jahn Regensburg on 21 July 2011. In his first season with Regensburg, he helped them win promotion to the 2. Bundesliga after a playoff victory over Karlsruher SC.

References

External links 
 

1989 births
Living people
People from Altötting
Sportspeople from Upper Bavaria
German footballers
Association football midfielders
Association football defenders
Association football forwards
2. Bundesliga players
3. Liga players
Regionalliga players
SV Wacker Burghausen players
FC Bayern Munich II players
SSV Jahn Regensburg players
Footballers from Bavaria